This Is Where I Live is an album by William Bell released on June 3, 2016 in the US and July 8, 2016 elsewhere. It won Bell a Grammy Award for Best Americana Album.

Reception

PopMatters gave the album 8 out of 10 stars, calling it "an imperative listen for anyone claiming to be a fan of rhythm and blues, both old and new."

Following his Grammy win, streaming of "Born Under A Bad Sign" (which Bell performed at the ceremony with Gary Clark Jr.) on Spotify increased by 4,950%, with overall streams increasing by 680%. Similarly, streaming of Bell's music on Pandora increased by 12,085%.

Track listing

References

2016 albums
Americana albums
Stax Records albums
Grammy Award for Best Americana Album
Albums produced by John Leventhal